This is a list of notable former students of London College of Communication, UAL, formerly known as the London College of Printing and, briefly, as the London College of Printing and Distributive Trades.

References

London College of Communication